The seventh edition of the Strade Bianche Donne took place on 6 March 2021. The Italian race is the first event of the 2021 UCI Women's World Tour as the usual first race of season in Australia, the Cadel Evans Great Ocean Road Race, was cancelled due to the COVID-19 pandemic. It was won by Chantal van den Broek-Blaak.

Route
The race started and finished in Siena, Italy.

Teams
Nine UCI Women's WorldTeams and fourteen UCI Women's Continental Teams made up the twenty-three teams that competed in the race. From the 135 riders who started the race, 85 finished.

UCI Women's WorldTeams

 
 
 
 
 
 
 
 
 

UCI Women's Continental Teams

Result

References

External links
 

Strade Bianche
Strade Bianche
Strade Bianche
Strade Bianche Women